The 2018–19 season is Birmingham City Football Club's 116th season in the English football league system and eighth consecutive season in the second-tier Championship. Under the management of Garry Monk, they began the season under transfer restrictions imposed by the English Football League (EFL) for breaches of their Profitability and Sustainability Regulations, and finished it in 17th place after a nine-point deduction was also imposed. The deduction put paid to hopes of promotion via the play-offs, but the team were able to avoid relegation with two matches still to play. As with all League clubs, the first team competed in the FA Cup and EFL Cup; they lost their first match in both competitions, to West Ham United in the former and to Reading in the latter.

After conflict with the board over transfer policy and other issues, Monk was sacked on 18 June 2019. His assistant, Pep Clotet, was named caretaker head coach.

Twenty-six players made at least one appearance in first-team competition, of whom three were loan signings; there were fourteen different goalscorers. Che Adams, who appeared in all 48 of Birmingham's first-team matches, top scored with 22 goals, all of which came in league matches. The average league attendance, of 22,483, was nearly 7% up on 2017–18.

The season covers the period from 1 July 2018 to 30 June 2019.

Overview
After a 2016–17 season in which the club had three different managers and avoided relegation on the final day, Birmingham repeated the process in 2017–18. Garry Monk, appointed in March, vowed to change the pattern: he would be "relentless, and whoever is not on board with that won't be here. The ones who are will be here. It has to be like that. We have to raise the mentality of the club. That goes for everyone at the club." Apart from assistant manager Pep Clotet, the remainder of his backroom staff, including first-team coach James Beattie and goalkeeping coach Darryl Flahavan, were those he had worked with before Middlesbrough sacked him some months earlier. That club had then placed his staff on gardening leave and included a clause preventing their working together or with Monk for a rival club for the next 12 months. After they joined Monk at Birmingham, Middlesbrough sought an injunction to enforce that clause, but the matter was settled out of court after a counter-claim for damages.

For sponsorship reasons, and in the light of the EFL's Profit and Sustainability (P&S) Regulations, the club's owners agreed a three-year naming rights package under which St Andrew's was renamed St Andrew's Trillion Trophy Stadium and the Wast Hills training ground became the Trillion Trophy Training Centre. It emerged in early July that the EFL had refused to register Birmingham's first signing of the summer windowDanish left-back Kristian Pedersenbecause of failure to comply with P&S requirements and had placed the club under a transfer embargo. On 30 July, BBC Sport quoted an EFL spokesperson confirming they had "been in regular contact with the club throughout the summer and set out on 13 July [their] requirements in respect of the basis upon which the club would be able to make additions to Garry Monk's squad." The club then issued a statement expressing their disappointment with the continuing embargo despite their best efforts to comply, and their understanding of and empathy with supporters' frustrations.

However, "after consideration of the legal position as between the Club, Player and the EFL" and despite the EFL being "exceptionally disappointed" at the club's attitude, a deal was reached. The club agreed to a business plan aimed at restricting expenditure, Pedersen was registered, and the club could make a further five signings under strict conditions, reported by the Birmingham Mail as meaning loans and free transfers only and a salary cap pitched at a "debilitating" level. The club faced further punishment, including possible points deductions, from an EFL commission to meet later in the year.

Birmingham made four signings in the summer transfer window: three loanswinger Connor Mahoney from AFC Bournemouth, striker Omar Bogle from Cardiff City, and midfielder Gary Gardneryounger brother of Craig Gardnerfrom Aston Villa, and one free transfer, goalkeeper Lee Camp, also from Cardiff City. They cancelled Diego Fabbrini's contract, loaned out Nicolai Brock-Madsen, Jonathan Grounds, Cheick Keita, Cheikh Ndoye and Greg Stewart, and tried unsuccessfully to offload high-earning goalkeepers David Stockdale and Tomasz Kuszczak.

In the January transfer window, Birmingham made the last of their five permitted signings, Swedish international midfielder or forward Kerim Mrabti, whose contract with Djurgården had expired. Bogle was recalled by his parent club, fringe players Luke Maxwell and Dan Scarr moved on, Viv Solomon-Otabor and Steve Seddon loaned out, and Stewart was recalled from Kilmarnock and loaned to Aberdeen instead. There was considerable interest from Premier League clubs in newly prolific striker Che Adams, but Birmingham did not want to sell, and no offer received was considered enough to force their hand given that the player could neither be replaced nor loaned back because of the signing restriction. A bid of £12 million from Burnley was the highest reported. The Times suggested that a refusal to sell might constitute a further aggravated breach of the P&S rules. It also emerged that the restriction also applied to extending the contracts of existing players, which had particular relevance to team captain Michael Morrison whose contract was due to expire at the end of the season.

The EFL hearing, originally scheduled for February 2019, was postponed to mid-March after a panel member recused themselves, "with the intention of the Disciplinary Commission delivering the outcome quickly so the matter can be fully resolved before the end of this season." The panel finally sat on 18 March, and ruled that nine points be deducted in the current season; neither party took up their right to appeal.

According to the Birmingham Mail, Monk turned the team into "a side vastly superior than the sum of its parts" to keep them in the top half of the table until a run of losses in March and a nine-point deduction led to a 17th-place finish. In June, it was reported that the relationship between Monk and chief executive Xuandong Ren had broken down. After making it clear he would not resign, Monk was sacked on 18 June. According to Ren in an interview with The Times, Monk was sacked because of "his attempt to use a single agent in transfer deals and his refusal to adapt the team's style of play"; "sources close to Monk" disagreed, and "suggested that Ren's comments were designed to explain the surprise sacking ... that has been badly received by many Birmingham fans." A club statement with echoes of Monk's own of a year earlier called for a change in footballing philosophy and stressed the vital importance of "everybody at the club to be sharing the same vision and commitment to the plans and processes." Despite the club's statement that they were not actively looking for a new permanent manager, Pep Clotet was appointed caretaker head coach, the remainder of the backroom staff stayed in post, and Craig Gardner was given a role as player-coach.

Pre-season
The home kit consists of a blue shirt with white trim on the shoulders and upper chest and white stripes down the side seams, white shorts with blue trim and blue stripes down the side seams, and blue socks with white trim at the turnover. The away kit has a yellow shirt with three blue stripes on the shoulders, blue shorts with yellow stripes down the side seams, and yellow socks with blue trim. The kits are supplied by Adidas and bear the logo of the club's principal sponsor, online bookmaker 888sport.

After a training camp based in Bad Häring, Austria, which included friendly matches against Akhmat Grozny of the Russian Premier League and German fourth-tier club SSV Ulm, Birmingham City's first-team pre-season programme continued with matches against Doncaster Rovers, Cheltenham Town, Las Palmas and Brighton & Hove Albion.

EFL Championship

August–September
Birmingham City opened their 2018–19 EFL Championship season at home to Norwich City, without midfielder David Davis and forward Isaac Vassell, both injured, as well as a number of out-of-favour players including both senior goalkeepers, David Stockdale and Tomasz Kuszczak. The team lined up in a 4–4–2 formation with debutant Connal Trueman in goal, Maxime Colin and new signing Kristian Pedersen at full back, Michael Morrison (captain) and Harlee Dean at centre back, Maikel Kieftenbeld alongside Craig Gardner in central midfield, Jota and Jacques Maghoma as wide midfielders, and Che Adams and Lukas Jutkiewicz in the forward line. Birmingham led for much of the second half, but late in stoppage time, Onel Hernández equalised for the visitors.

It was the first of a string of matches in which Birmingham either under-performed, as in the 1–0 defeat at Middlesbrough or the goalless draw with Queens Park Rangers when they had only one shot on target, or were unable to take advantage of their chances, as in the goalless draws with Swansea City and Sheffield United, a missed penalty against West Bromwich Albion, and the visit to Nottingham Forest when they let slip a two-goal lead. In what remained of August, Birmingham brought in four players: Lee Camp took over from Trueman in goal from the third match of the season and Gary Gardner replaced his brother in central midfield, while forward Omar Bogle and winger Connor Mahoney joined the first-team squad.

Their first win finally arrived on 22 September, away to Leeds United, unbeaten and top of the table, courtesy of Adams' sharpness and what Leeds' manager Marcelo Bielsa claimed as a "tactical error" on his part. After conceding what Monk described as two poor goals stemming from two mistakes, Jutkiewicz scored twice in the second half to secure a draw at home to Ipswich Town and finish September in 16th place.

October–November
Birmingham began October with their eighth draw in eleven league matches, away to Brentford, despite Kieftenbeld's second-half red card for an off-the-ball incident involving opponent Neal Maupay. Garry Monk was also sent to the stands for his verbal reaction to the dismissal: he said afterwards that he was expecting Maupay to be booked for feigning injury. Kieftenbeld's sending off was rescinded on appeal, so he was available for the next match, against Rotherham United, in which Jutkiewicz scored his first Birmingham hat-trick. Jutkiewicz continued with goals against Reading and Sheffield Wednesday and an assist for Adams' winning goal at Stoke City in a run of four wins that earned him the Championship Player of the Month award for October and earned Monk a nomination as Championship Manager of the Month as the team rose to ninth place in the table.

In three consecutive matches, Birmingham scored first and failed to win. Away defeats against Derby County and Aston Villa, in which Jutkiewicz reached double figures, came either side of a home match in which Adams took advantage of defensive errors to put his side 2–0 ahead and Hull City scored three times in 14 minutes before Adams completed his hat-trick to level the scores. Having conceded ten goals in those three matches, Monk wanted his players to "get back to that toughness" that earned them their eleven-match unbeaten run. They finished November with a clean sheet in a 2–0 win at Millwall that left them in tenth place.

December–February
A rare goal from Kieftenbeld opened Birmingham's scoring in December: seconds after half-time, Preston North End's goalkeeper Declan Rudd misjudged an overhit pass, the ball went through his legs and into the net. That win was followed by a first home defeat since March, inflicted by Bristol City. The year ended with two draws and two wins, Adams took his goals total into double figures, the largest crowd of the season thus far, of 26,344, saw Birmingham complete a double over their former manager Gary Rowett's Stoke City via Omar Bogle's fine individual goalthe only one he scored for the club before his loan ended early and the team reached seventh place.

Two defeats and a draw preceded the visit to Swansea City, the club where Monk had spent much of his career as player and then manager. Pedersen was sent off before half-time, but Birmingham came back from 2–1 behind to tie the scores, and then took a 71st-minute lead when Adams "whipped in an excellent curling shot from " that was to win the club's Goal of the Season award. In the fourth minute of stoppage time, Oli McBurnie equalised; the draw left Birmingham in twelfth position. Adams scored in all four January matches, to take his total to 15 for the season.

Adams continued the run with four goals in the first two matches of February, a penalty against Nottingham Forest and a hat-trick at Queens Park Rangers in which Birmingham took a 4–0 first-half lead before conceding three goals and relying on Camp saving a stoppage-time penalty to hold on to the win. An unexpected home defeat to Bolton Wanderers was followed by a 2–2 draw with Blackburn Rovers in which Adams took his total for the season past 20; he was named Championship Player of the Month. February ended with Birmingham in 8th place after a win away to Bristol City.

March–May
With the EFL hearing delayed until mid-March, Birmingham failed to score a goal or gain a point from the first four fixtures of that month. The eventual nine-point deduction was announced on 22 March, a week before the visit to local rivals West Bromwich Albion, where they twice took the lead before the hosts equalised via a penalty awarded for a foul outside the penalty area and then went on to win 3–2. The result left Birmingham in 17th position, five points above the relegation places having played more matches than the teams below them.

They went through the remaining seven fixtures unbeaten. Adams' 22nd and last goal of the season completed a double over Leeds United, the return to goalscoring form of Jutkiewicz and Morrison earned points against Sheffield United, Ipswich Town and Derby County, and a comfortable win against Rotherham United confirmed their Championship status for next season with two matches still to play. They finished 17th, twelve points above the relegation places.

Match results
General source: Match content not verifiable from these sources is referenced individually.

League table

Result summary

FA Cup

As with all teams in the top two tiers of English football, Birmingham City entered the FA Cup in the third round. They were drawn to play Premier League club West Ham United at the London Stadium. Marko Arnautović gave West Ham an early lead, but in a "robust and open encounter" Birmingham missed several chances to equalise, and substitute Andy Carroll doubled the lead in stoppage time.

EFL Cup

In the first round of the EFL Cup, Birmingham were drawn away to another Championship team, Reading. With a televised Championship fixture three days later, Monk made eleven changes from the team that started the previous Saturday, with debuts for Lee Camp, Dan Scarr and Gary Gardner and first starts for Connor Mahoney, Beryly Lubala and Omar Bogle. Reading fielded a full-strength side and were rarely tested.

Transfers

In

 Brackets round a club's name indicate the player's contract with that club had expired before he joined Birmingham.

Out

 Brackets round a club's name denote the player joined that club after his Birmingham City contract expired.

Loan in

Loan out

Appearances and goals
Sources:
Numbers in parentheses denote appearances as substitute.
Players with name and squad number struck through and marked  left the club during the playing season.
Players with names in italics and marked * were on loan from another club for the whole of their season with Birmingham.
Players listed with no appearances have been in the matchday squad but only as unused substitutes.
Key to positions: GK – Goalkeeper; DF – Defender; MF – Midfielder; FW – Forward

References

Birmingham City
Birmingham City F.C. seasons